Inflorescent is the third studio album by British indie pop trio Friendly Fires. It was released on 16 August 2019 through Polydor Records and is the group's first album in eight years, following Pala, released in 2011.

Background
After the band released and finished promoting their second album Pala the band parted ways on a hiatus. The groups frontman and singer Ed MacFarlane was working and contributing with acts, such as Disclosure and The Magician. MacFarlane also revealed that he had no intention of creating another record within the same vein as Pala and also revealing he had been working on more experimental material and the other bandmates were doing the same. MacFarlane and the group's guitarist Edd Gibson reunited to join forces with The Advisory Circle to work on music and, eventually formed a group, which was revealed in 2016 to be named The Pattern Forms. They released an album called Peel Away the Ivy in October of that year.

The band came back from their hiatus in 2018 when they released the album's lead single, entitled "Love Like Waves". One source described the song as, "taking inspiration from the previous solo electronic collaborations of the band members" but still "has all of the details that constitutes Friendly Fires’ sound."

The band announced the album in June 2019, alongside the release of its fourth single "Silhouettes" and a UK and Europe Tour for later on in the year, as well as a couple stops in Australia and North America.

Critical reception

At Metacritic, which assigns a normalised rating out of 100 to reviews from mainstream critics, the album received an average score of 70, based on 10 reviews, which indicates "generally favorable reviews".

The album received mixed, but mostly positive reviews, with an average score of 67% as indicated on Album of the Year, a review aggregator site.

The music retail distributor HMV commented on the album's vibe, describing it as "lean, slick and very, very danceable." They also talked about the album's possible delivery, saying "Whether it's down to the influence of producers like James Ford, Mark Ralph and the Disclosure boys, or the time that Macfarlane and co. have reportedly spent reconnecting with the musical influences they first bonded over and dancing in clubs together again, Friendly Fires have returned to the fray with an album that feels like a much more focussed version of their trademark sound."

British music journal NME reviewed the album's songs as "joyful and inoffensive" and also criticised, "The worst part of 'Inflorescent' is that you won't hate it; you'll just forget you've even listened to it."

Online newspaper The Independent rated the album 2 out of 5 and compared the band and the album's work to that of Take That, Tears for Fears and Hot Chip, with its standout track being "Offline", which they described as having a sonic reference to ""Outside"-era George Michael."

The Evening Standard acclaimed the album, stating that it was "a return to the dancefloor after eight years away." They elaborated, " The channelling of Brazilian disco, funk and samba influences, plus singer Ed Macfarlane's endearing dad-dancing, made their lithe indie pop refreshing. On Inflorescent — their first album following an eight year hiatus — they aim brazenly for the dancefloor."

Track listing
Track metadata adapted from Apple Music.

Notes
  signifies a co-producer
  signifies an additional producer
 "Offline" is an un-credited collaboration with Friend Within.
 "Lack of Love" is a cover of the original performed by Charles B and Adonis.

Sample credits
 "Offline" contains elements of "Chega Mais (Imaginei Você Dançando)", written and performed by Banda Black Rio.

Charts

References

2019 albums
Friendly Fires albums
Polydor Records albums